Marko Alvir (born 19 April 1994) is a Croatian professional football midfielder who plays for Viktoria Plzeň.

Club career
Alvir signed for Slovenian team Domžale from Atlético Madrid's youth system on a free transfer in 2015. On 1 January 2017, he signed for Slavia Prague of the Czech First League.

On 6 July 2021, Alvir joined Slovenian side Maribor on a season-long loan from Viktoria Plzeň.

References

External links
 
 
 

1994 births
Living people
Footballers from Zagreb
Association football midfielders
Croatian footballers
Croatia youth international footballers
Atlético Madrid C players
NK Domžale players
SK Slavia Prague players
1. FK Příbram players
FC Viktoria Plzeň players
SK Dynamo České Budějovice players
NK Maribor players
Tercera División players
Slovenian PrvaLiga players
Czech First League players
Croatian expatriate footballers
Croatian expatriate sportspeople in Spain
Expatriate footballers in Spain
Croatian expatriate sportspeople in Slovenia
Expatriate footballers in Slovenia
Croatian expatriate sportspeople in the Czech Republic
Expatriate footballers in the Czech Republic